The following is a list of players who played at least fifty games in the North American Soccer League, a fully professional soccer league which existed in the United States and Canada between 1968 and 1984.

List of players

Sources
NASL Jerseys

North American Soccer League (1968–1984) players
Association football player non-biographical articles